North Sea or Northern Sea may refer to:
 North Sea, a marginal sea east of Great Britain, south of Norway, west of Denmark, north of France
 North Sea Region, European countries and regions that have access to the North Sea
 North Sea, New York, a hamlet in Suffolk County, Long Island
 Yellow Sea, in a Chinese military context. cf. East Sea (East China Sea) and South Sea (South China Sea) for unit names
 North Sea Fleet
 Sea of Okhotsk, in ancient Chinese sources, prior to Russian colonization and renaming of the same
 Lake Baikal, the North Sea of the Four Seas
 Northern Sea or North Aral Sea, the portion of the former Aral Sea that is fed by the Syr Darya River
 Beihai (disambiguation), translated into English as North Sea
 Arctic Ocean, the smallest, shallowest and northern-most of the world's five major oceans
 The portion of the North Atlantic Ocean north of Iceland
 Oceanus Borealis, see Mars ocean hypothesis
 Boreal Sea, was a Mesozoic-era seaway that lay along the northern border of Laurasia
 The Caribbean Sea, from the 16th century, Europeans visiting the region distinguished the "South Sea" (the Pacific Ocean south of the isthmus of Panama) from the "North Sea" (the Caribbean Sea north of the same isthmus)

Arts and entertainment
 North Sea (film), a 1938 documentary film
 The North Sea, a 1966 painting by LS Lowry

See also
 South Sea (disambiguation)
 East Sea (disambiguation)
 West Sea (disambiguation)